Sphingosine-1-phosphate receptor 3 also known as S1PR3 is a human gene which encodes a G protein-coupled receptor which binds the lipid signaling molecule sphingosine 1-phosphate (S1P).  Hence this receptor is also known as S1P3.

Function 

This gene encodes a member of the EDG family of receptors, which are G protein-coupled receptors. This protein has been identified as a functional receptor for sphingosine 1-phosphate and likely contributes to the regulation of angiogenesis and vascular endothelial cell function.

See also
 Lysophospholipid receptor

References

Further reading

External links

 

G protein-coupled receptors